Carmina is an album by pianist Tete Montoliu recorded in 1984 and released on the JazzIzz label.

Track listing
 "Please! No More Smoking!" (Tete Montoliu) – 3:19
 "You Are Too Beautiful" (Richard Rodgers, Lorenz Hart) – 9:04
 "Scandia Sky" (Kenny Dorham) – 6:15
 "Salt Peanuts" (Dizzy Gillespie) – 2:19
 "Carmina" (Tete Montoliu) – 7:23
 "My Foolish Heart" (Victor Young, Ned Washington) – 9:00
 "Stablemates" (Benny Golson) – 6:38

Personnel
Tete Montoliu – piano
John Heard – bass
Sherman Ferguson – drums

References

Tete Montoliu albums
1984 albums